Sayersville is an unincorporated community in Bastrop County, Texas, United States. It is located within the Greater Austin metropolitan area.

History
The town was founded in 1886 by William Elliott by the name Sayers next to the Missouri-Kansas-Texas Railroad. A post office was established at Sayersville in 1889 and remained in operation until 1922, with Henry M. Green as postmaster. It began as a cotton pressing center but later produced many fuels such as cordwood and lignite from a nearby mine in 1913. It also served as a supply center for farmers, miners, and brick factory employees in nearby Lasher before it closed in 1915. Sayersville had a church and several stores between 1911 and 1916. The cordwood industry came to an end when natural gas became more abundant in the 1920s. The mine ceased operation when a fire broke out in 1928. By the next decade, the railroad stopped passenger service, but the community had 50 residents and two businesses in 1940. The population remained at 50 until the community stopped its census counts in the 1960s. An elm tree in the community, which was the community's best-known natural feature, was lost in 1985. The church building still stood in the community in the early 1980s, but the only business in the community was the Bucking Hill Bar, which was built in 1953, and served as a meeting place for the local historical association.

The community's original name, Sayers, was changed to Sayersville because there is already a community with this name in Bexar County. Its historical association has been publishing a quarterly bulletin since 1982.

Geography

Education
Sayersville had its own school sometime between 1911 and 1916. Today, Sayersville is served by the Elgin Independent School District and Bastrop Independent School District.

References

Unincorporated communities in Bastrop County, Texas
Unincorporated communities in Texas